Steven Kenneth Fairweather (born December 29, 1977) is a Canadian musician, radio show host, poet, and comic book writer. He is the bassist of the Canadian punk rock band Gob and founder of the Internet radio station, Stranger Radio.

Professional career

1993 - 1997 

Fairweather joined the Gothic Rock band Waiting for God, along with member Michael Balch of industrial metal band Ministry affiliation

2000 - 2010 

Fairweather joined Revelation Records' emo/post-hardcore band By a Thread. Toured and recorded with Castle Project and appeared on demo versions of songs by sub pops' punk rock band the Black Halos.

June 2008 Fairweather joined the certified Gold album selling and  juno nominated Canadian punk rock band Gob

2011 - 2016 

JAN 2011 Fairweather released his debut solo album you-and-yours

APR 2011 emo/post-hardcore band By a Thread released their long-awaited sophomore album on Revelation Records. The label is known for releases by bands such as Youth of Today, Sick of It All, Quicksand, and Gorilla Biscuits.

MAY 2013 On the science fiction Showcase television series Continuum  the main character triggers a hidden psychiatric protocol program called  "Mr Fairweather" played by Alessandro Juliani named after Fairweather.

May 27, 2014, Gob announced that Apt. 13 will be released on August 26 through New Damage Records.

In August 2014 Fairweather released his second solo album. "Visitors" This time working with Gob bandmate, and Producer Thomas Thacker. Who also performed backup vocals on the track "Because in". As well with guest vocals by Pink Mountaintops, Bonnie 'Prince' Billy's Lie Down in the Light and the Cave Singers vocalist Ashley Webber. Known as Ashley Shadow in her solo career  Who meet when they both worked for organizations that meet the basic living requirements of the chronically poor, drug addicted and mentally ill in Vancouver's Downtown Eastside neighborhood, such as Insite,the first legal supervised drug injection site in North America

In June 2015 Fairweather appeared in a commercial for Lexus Winning the CSC award in 2016

2017 to 2021 

Feb 2017, Fairweather was brought on to host a radio show "The Church of Steventology" for 8-Ball Community a New York City-based artist collective. Who was Voted listeners’ Choice Best Online Radio Station in North America - Mixcloud Online Radio Awards 2018. And was featured in Village Voice and Time Out

In February 2018 Fairweather joined Daphne Guinness for The Blonds New York Fashion Week show. Performing the song "Riot", recorded by David Bowie producer Tony Visconti

In April 2018 Fairweather founded Stranger Radio, an online radio station that he curates.

Nov 2019 Fairweather joined Gob bandmates Theo Goutzinakis & Gabe Mantle for the project "Theo and the Thugs" Western Canadian tour.

In July 2020 Fairweather published The Colebrook Library – selected poems 1995–2000. Containing writings from his teenaged years exploring isolation, loss, romantic relationships and addiction.

Jan 2021 Fairweather launched his YouTube channel, showcasing the comedic rants from his  online radio show "The Church of Steventology" on Stranger Radio.

Sept 2021 Fairweather released "The Volume"  on Soundcloud. A musical collective that is heavily 90's trip-hop influenced. A project that Fairweather composes the music and produces, featuring UK vocalists including the rapper Dxsh and Betty Adewole, an English model, rapper, and actress. Known for her portrayal of an Amazonian in Wonder Woman and Wonder Woman 1984, and her London based hip hop trio "Cut With"

2022 to Present 

Jan 2023 The Colebrook Library – selected poems 1995–2000. Fairweathers book of poetry was re-released in both paperback and kindle versions

Feb 2023 Fairweather released book one of his comic book series "CHAAYA AND THE RED HAND". Which tells the revenge story of a young woman in India.

Works

Comic book
  CHAAYA AND THE READ HAND - Book One - FEB 2023

Plot

Set in the streets of India, a young woman named Chayya, is on a mission to hunt down known killers and abusers. Along her journey, she meets an excommunicated forest guard.
They align and join forces to fight back against a corrupt system. As they forge ahead, they discover an extremely dark history behind the powers that be. Within this sect, is an evil beyond anything they could have ever imagined

Poetry
 The Colebrook Library – selected poems 1995–2000 (Hardcover - July 2020). 
 The Colebrook Library – selected poems 1995–2000 (Paperback / Kindle - Jan 2023)

Discography

External links

References 

1977 births
Living people
Canadian punk rock bass guitarists
Musicians from Vancouver
Place of birth missing (living people)
21st-century Canadian bass guitarists